Crophius disconotus is a species of true bug in the family Oxycarenidae. It is found in Central America and North America.

References

Lygaeoidea
Articles created by Qbugbot
Insects described in 1832